Shangchan Temple is a Buddhist temple located on Mount Jiuhua in Qingyang County, Anhui, China.

History

Qing dynasty
The temple was first established by Zongyan in 1667, under the Qing dynasty (1644–1911). In 1758, in the reign of Qianlong Emperor (1736–1795), abbot Tianshi added the Hall of Guanyin to the temple. It was devastated by war between the Qing army and the Taiping Rebellion during ruling of Xianfeng Emperor (1851–1861). In 1862 abbot Kaitai renovated and refurbished it. In the Guangxu period (1875–1908), Chan master Qingyong erected the Hall of Thousand Buddhas.

Republic of China
During the Republic of China in 1928, abbot Zhifang redecorated the Mahavira Hall.

People's Republic of China
After the founding of the Communist State in 1956, local government repaired the temple, but one year later, the Hall of Guanyin turned to ashes by a catastrophic fire. In 1983 it has been designated as National Key Buddhist Temple in Han Chinese Area by the State Council of China. A modern reconstruction of the entire temple complex was carried out in 1987.

Architecture
The existing main buildings include the Shanmen, Four Heavenly Kings Hall, Mahavira Hall, Hall of Guanyin and Buddhist Texts Library.

References

External links
 

Buddhist temples on Mount Jiuhua
Buildings and structures in Chizhou
Tourist attractions in Chizhou
1862 establishments in China
19th-century Buddhist temples
Religious buildings and structures completed in 1862